Banzragchiin Zundui (born 14 October 1937) is a Mongolian cross-country skier. He competed in the men's 15 kilometre event at the 1964 Winter Olympics.

References

1937 births
Living people
Mongolian male cross-country skiers
Olympic cross-country skiers of Mongolia
Cross-country skiers at the 1964 Winter Olympics
Place of birth missing (living people)
20th-century Mongolian people